Francesco di Valdambrino (circa 1375 – 1435) was an Italian sculptor in wood, active in Tuscany.

He was born near Siena. He was one of the contestants for the commission to decorate the doors of the Baptistery of Florence. He was a colleague of Jacopo della Quercia, and was influenced by Nino Pisano. Among his listed works are:

 Madonna dei Chierici, in the Volterra Cathedral
St Crescenzo, St Savino, and St Vittore, (1409) from Duomo da Siena, now in Museo dell'Opera
Annunciation (circa 1410–1411), Church of San Lorenzo, Asciano, now in Palazzo Corboli
Child Jesus (1410-1415) now in Pinacoteca Nazionale, Siena
San Pietro (1423) from Confraternita di San Pietro, Montalcino, now in Musei di Montalcino
Crucifix (1410-1415) from church of Sant'Egidio, Montalcino, now in Musei di Montalcino

References

External links 

14th-century births
15th-century deaths
People from Siena
15th-century Italian sculptors
Italian male sculptors